Thomas McEwan RSW (1846–1914) was a Scottish painter in oils and watercolour, of mainly domestic scenes.

History
Born near Glasgow into a poor family with artistic inclinations, his father being an amateur artist and a friend of James Docherty (landscape painter). He was an apprentice to a pattern designer in Glasgow, but in 1863 he attended evening classes at the Glasgow School of Art under Robert Greenlees. During the 1860s he exhibited at the Royal Glasgow Institute and in 1872 embarked on a sketching holiday with James Docherty, working on Isla and Jura.

Dutch influence can be seen in his work, especially that of Dutch painter Jozef Israëls. He used members of his family as models and was particularly fond of portraying grandparents and their children sewing and engaged in similar activities in the home and in open farmsteads, often with poultry in the foreground. The influence of Wilkie can occasionally be seen. At his best he was a very good artist, and was for several years President of the Glasgow Art Club.
He lived for many years at Rosevale, Helensburgh.

He was elected member of the Royal Scottish Society of Painters in Watercolour in 1883.

Artwork
Some of his work listed here:
 Portrait of a Boy – Date: Unknown. Oil on canvas, 31 × 26 cm
 Tea Time – Date: Unknown. Oil on canvas, 45.7 × 61 cm
 A Posy – Date: Unknown. Oil on canvas.
 Border Tales – Date: Unknown. Oil on canvas, 24 × 18 in (61 × 45.7 cm)
 Woman Seated Beside A Spinning Wheel – Date: 1876. Oil on canvas, 61 × 51 cm
 Nurslings – Date: Unknown. Oil on canvas, 18 × 14 in (46 × 36 cm)
 Domestic Scene, Highland Interior Domestic Scene, Highland Interior – Date: Unknown. Oil on canvas, 71 × 92 cm (28 × 36¼ in.)
 An Old Woman Reading A Letter – Date: Unknown. Oil on canvas, l24cm × 16.5 cm
 Sewing – Date: Unknown. Oil on canvas, 45 cm × 60 cm
 Companions – Date: Unknown. Oil on canvas, 18 1/8 × 24 in (46 × 60.9 cm)
 Interesting News – Date: Unknown. Oil on canvas, 46 × 35 1/2 cm. ; 18 × 14 in
 The Letter – Date: Unknown. Oil on canvas, 7 × 51/2 in (17.7 × 13.9 cm)
 Grace Before Meat – Date: Unknown. Oil on canvas board, 10 × 14 in (25.4 × 35.6 cm)
 A Request – Date: Unknown. Oil on canvas, 30.5 × 25.5 cm, 12 × 10 in
 Mending Time – Date: Unknown. Oil on canvas, 25 × 20 cm, 10 × 8 in
 A Divert – Date: Unknown. Oil on canvas, 35 × 45.5 cm, 13 × 18 in
 A Highland Industry – Date: Unknown. Oil on canvas, 76 × 64 cm, 30 × 25 in
 Figures And Poultry Before A Thatched Cottage – Date: Unknown. Pencil and watercolour heightened with white, 9 × 13 in (24 × 33.6 cm)
 Spinning At Her Wheel – Date: Unknown. Oil on canvas, 61 × 46 cm, 24 × 18 in
 Highland Industry – Date: Unknown. Oil on canvas, 30 × 25 in (63.5 × 76.2 cm)
 A Wayside Chat – Date: 1874. Oil on canvas, 44 × 59 cm (17 5/16 × 23 1/4 in)
 Companions – Date: 1880. Oil on canvas, 30.5 × 25.5 cm, 12 × 10 in
 Evening Pursuits – Date: 1884. Oil on canvas, 18 1/4 × 24 in (46.3 × 60.9 cm)
 A Liberal Defeat – Date: 1884. Oil on canvas, 18 × 14 in (45.8 × 35.6 cm)
 Somebody's Coming – Date: 1885. Oil on canvas, 16 × 12 in (40.6 × 30.3 cm)
 Reading The Bible – Date: 1890. Oil on canvas, 49.3 × 39 cm
 Hard At Work – Date: 1890. Oil on canvas, 36.2 × 32.4 cm (14 1/4 × 12 3/4 in)
 Learn Young – learn fair – Date: 1890. Oil on canvas, 30.5 × 23.5 cm, 12 × 9in
 An Artless Tale – Date: 1891. Oil on canvas, 46.5 × 34 cm
 Shepherd's Cottage – Date: 1893. Oil on canvas, 50 × 60 cm
 The Sunbeam – Date: 1895. Oil on canvas, 59.5 × 44.5 cm, 23 1/2 × 17 1/2 in
 Interior: The Spinning Wheel – Date: 1896. Oil on canvas, 50.8 × 61 cm
 An Interior – Date: 1898. Oil on canvas, 61 × 74.9 cm
 A Scotch Idyll – Date: 1899. Oil on canvas, 50.5 × 61 cm, 19 × 24 in
 In Time Of War/ "Mony A Sweet Babe Fatherless/ And Mony A Widow Mourning" – Date: 1900. Oil on canvas, 63 1/2 × 76 cm, (25 × 30 in)
 A Favoured Guest – Date: 1900. Oil on canvas, 17.7/8 × 24 in, (45.5 × 61 cm)
 Flutist – Date: Unknown. Charcoal on paper.
 The Golf Match – Date: Unknown. Oil on canvas, signed 29 × 45 cm
 Meditation – Date: 1889. Oil on canvas, signed, 290 mm × 240 mm

References

External links
 
 Paintings: http://www.fineartbase.com/Thomas-McEwan-oil-paintings.html
 Paintings: http://www.artfact.com/catalog/searchLots.cfm?scp=m&catalogRef=&shw=50&ord=2&ad=DESC&img=0&alF=1&houseRef=&houseLetter=A&artistRef=UQ87SINFB4&areaID=&countryID=&regionID=&stateID=&fdt=0&tdt=0&fr=0&to=0&wa=&wp=&wo=&nw=&upcoming=0&rp=&hi=&rem=FALSE&cs=0&row=51

1846 births
1914 deaths
19th-century Scottish painters
Scottish male painters
20th-century Scottish painters
Alumni of the Glasgow School of Art
19th-century Scottish male artists
20th-century Scottish male artists